
Lake Vert is a lake in the Chablais region of the canton of Valais, Switzerland. The lake is located in the municipality of Val-d'Illiez, at an elevation of 1972 metres, near the border with France. Lac de Chésery lies 600 metres north.

Vert